Argyle Shore Provincial Park is a provincial park in on in Prince Edward Island, Canada. It opened in 1961 and is 9.59 ha. The park's name comes from the area's early 19th-century settlers from Argyle Shire, Scotland.

References 

Provincial parks of Prince Edward Island
Parks in Queens County, Prince Edward Island